The Jewish courtyard in Speyer (also known as the Speyer Jewry-Court), is an historic and archeological site located in the inner city of Speyer, Germany. Built in stages between 1104 (when the synagogue was consecrated) and the 14th century, the courtyard contains some of the oldest and best-preserved Jewish community buildings. Along with the other ShUM-cities of Worms and Mainz, Speyer was the hometown of one of the most important Jewish communities in Middle Ages in northern Europe. Because of its historical importance and its testimony to the European Jewish cultural tradition, the Jewish courtyard was inscribed on the UNESCO World Heritage List in 2021.

Description
The Jewish courtyard consists of the remains of the synagogue, its courtyard, and the women's shul (prayer room), an intact Mikvah for ritual washing, and a yeshiva for teaching and studying. The synagogue, courtyard, and mikvah were constructed in the early 12th century using sandstone, and the women's shul and yeshiva were built out of brick in the 13th and 14th centuries. The synagogue was built in the Romanesque style and is the oldest example of the window arrangement that would become commonplace in Ashkenazi Jewish architecture, with arched windows surrounding a central round window. When it was remodeled, it retained most of its Romanesque features. The women's shul, attached to the south side of the synagogue, was built in high Gothic style with a ribbed vault ceiling. The north and east walls of the yeshiva are the only above-ground aspect that still exist today. However, it is clear that the yeshiva was built in a similar style to the women's shul.

Located to the east of the synagogue, the mikvah was built in the Romanesque style and contains elaborate sculpting and masonry. In particular, the anteroom overlooking the ritual bath contains intricate stonework, with a four-part window wall and ornate capitals. The same stonemasons who built the synagogue and mikvah also likely worked on the Christian churches and cathedrals in Speyer.

History

In the late 11th century, Jews fleeing persecution in the town of Mainz began to take refuge in Speyer. In 1084, the Bishop of Speyer, Rüdiger Huzmann, issued a letter of protection for the fledgling Jewish community, intending to grow the economy of Speyer. This protection was later expanded by Henry IV, Holy Roman Emperor in 1090, beginning a "golden age" of Judaism in Speyer. 

The oldest building in the Jewish courtyard is synagogue, which was consecrated on 21 September 1104. The first documented mention of the Mikvah was in 1126, making it the earliest documented mikvah in Europe, and its subterranean components have been nearly unmodified for centuries. In 1196, the synagogue was burnt in a pogrom and was subsequently reconstructed. In the mid 13th century, the synagogue was renovated in Gothic style and the women's synagogue was built next to it. Finally, the mid-14th century, the yeshiva was constructed. 
  
The Jewish community in Speyer existed until the beginning of the 16th century. The exact time and circumstances of the destruction are unknown. The synagogue was used for an armory by Speyer until the city was destroyed in 1689 during the Nine Years' War. Afterwards, the buildings in the Jewish courtyard were leased out for building huts, and then was divided into residential allotments before 1999 when the city of Speyer bought the area and removed the non-medieval buildings.

References

External links
 

Speyer
Historic Jewish communities in Europe
Buildings and structures in Rhineland-Palatinate
World Heritage Sites in Germany